USS Direct (AM-90) was an  of the United States Navy. It was laid down on 26 December 1941 by the Dravo Corporation, Neville Island, Pittsburgh, Pennsylvania, launched on 25 April 1942, and commissioned on 31 August 1942. The ship started conversion to a submarine chaser on 16 May 1944 at Norfolk, Virginia, and was reclassified PC-1594 on 1 June 1944.

World War II Atlantic Ocean Operations 
The Direct arrived at Bermuda on 30 December 1942 for anti-submarine patrol and escort duty until arriving at New York on 24 April 1944. On 15 May she began conversion to a submarine chaser patrol vessel at Norfolk, Virginia, and on 1 June 1944 her name was canceled and she was reclassified PC-1594.

Submarine chaser PC-1594 
The PC-1594 sailed from Norfolk, Virginia on 13 June 1944 for training off Bermuda. On 6 July she rendezvoused with a convoy bound for Bizerte, Tunisia, arriving on the 23rd. A week later she departed for Naples, arriving 2 August for anti-submarine patrol and escort duty. She took part in the invasion of southern France on 15 August and continued to serve on convoy and patrol duty in the Mediterranean from Palermo, Bizerte, and Oran until 27 May 1945 when she sailed for the United States.

Awards 
PC-1594 received one battle star for the invasion of southern France.

Post-war decommissioning 
She arrived at Jacksonville, Florida on 15 June. She was decommissioned on 9 November 1945, and transferred to the Maritime Administration for disposal on 29 July 1946.

It was than registered in 1946 by the Mechanical Equipment Co. and in 1947 by Harry F. Allsman Co. as the Allmac. All assets of that company were taken over by J. Ray McDermott in 1948. In 1950 the vessel was scrapped.

References 

 Williams, G.H. (2013): World War II U.S. Navy Vessels in Private Hands. The Boats and Ships Sold and Registered for Commercial and Recreational Purposes Under the American Flag, McFarland

External links
 

 

Adroit-class minesweepers
Ships built in Pittsburgh
1942 ships
World War II minesweepers of the United States
World War II patrol vessels of the United States
Ships built by Dravo Corporation